Chopper Hunt is a side-view shoot 'em up written by Tom Hudson and published by Imagic in 1984 for the Atari 8-bit family and Commodore 64. It was one of the last games from Imagic before the company went out of business. The Atari 8-bit original was previously released by ANALOG Software as Buried Bucks in 1982. In both games, the player files a helicopter that uses bombs to unearth buried items.

Gameplay

Development
ANALOG Software, the game publishing label of Atari 8-bit magazine ANALOG Computing, published Buried Bucks in 1982. The name is stylized as Buried Buck$. Programmer Tom Hudson documented the expanding explosion effect used in the game as an article in ANALOG Computing, including the assembly language source code. The same effect was used in another game for the magazine, Planetary Defense. Hudson later told Atari Explorer that Buried Bucks was his first Atari 8-bit game and called it "pretty simplistic."

The 1984 Imagic release changed the name to Chopper Hunt and made some alterations to the visuals. A Commodore 64 port was published simultaneously.

Reception
As part of a "Five Great Games for the Atari" article in 1983, John J. Anderson reviewed Buried Bucks: "once in a while a package appears that takes a unique premise and develops it into a new game that bears little resemblance to anything that has come before." Later he commented, "The level of graphics and sound in the program is utterly professional."

In a 1985 review in Antic, Jack Powell wrote, "Chopper Hunt would make a very nice public domain game," and "If you plunk down your hard-earned money for this outdated arcade game, you are helping to prove that Barnum is right."

References

External links
Chopper Hunt at Atari Mania
Chopper Hunt at Gamebase 64

1984 video games
Atari 8-bit family games
Commodore 64 games
Helicopter video games
Imagic games
Shoot 'em ups
Video games developed in the United States
Single-player video games